The Amambaí Mountains (Serra de Amambai, Cordillera de Amambai) is a low range of mountains along part of the Brazil-Paraguay border. In southwest Brasil, it is found in the western Mato Grosso do Sul state.

References

Mountain ranges of Brazil